Hamad Jalal (Arabic:حمد جلال) (born 7 May 1995) is an Emirati footballer. He currently plays for Al Bataeh as a midfielder.

Career
He formerly played for Al-Shaab, Al-Dhaid, Dibba Al-Hisn, and Al Bataeh.

References

External links
 

1995 births
Living people
Emirati footballers
Al-Shaab CSC players
Al Dhaid SC players
Dibba Al-Hisn Sports Club players
Al Bataeh Club players
UAE Pro League players
UAE First Division League players
Association football midfielders
Place of birth missing (living people)